The Mon River Trail is a rail trail located in West Virginia, United States.

The trail is composed of two separate sections - the north section and the south section, which are connected by the Caperton Trail.

It is relatively flat and follows the Monongahela River in a wooded valley.

Together with the Caperton Trail and Deckers Creek Trail, it forms a  network of multi-use, non-motorized use, trails connecting Marion County, Monongalia County and Preston County.

Location

North Section
 Northern terminus is the Pennsylvania state line near Stewartstown, West Virginia where it connects to the Sheepskin Trail.
 Southern terminus at the connection with the Caperton Trail at Morgantown, West Virginia northern city limits.

South Section
 Northeastern terminus at the connection with the Caperton Trail along  at Morgantown southern city limits.
 Southwestern terminus at the connection with the Marion County Trail in Prickett's Fort State Park 

See also
 Sheepskin Trail

References
 http://www.montrails.org

Rail trails in West Virginia
Protected areas of Monongalia County, West Virginia
Protected areas of Marion County, West Virginia
Transportation in Monongalia County, West Virginia
Transportation in Marion County, West Virginia